Jean-Marie Paul Bauchet (Orléans, 1 May 1900 - ) was a French Carmelite (of the Congregation of the Blessed Sacrament), and Hebraist. Bauchet re-edited the Hebrew New Testament of Franz Delitzsch. He received his doctorate from the Hebrew University of Jerusalem in 1949.

Works
 various works in Hebrew; inc. The Life of St. Dominic
 Paul Bauchet, 'Transcription and Translation of a Psalm from Sukenik's Dead Sea scroll', CBQ 12 (1950), 331–5. 7.

References

Translators of the New Testament into Hebrew